Lechmi is a Malayalam-language Indian comedy horror film directed by B.N Shajeer Sha, and story by Sajeer Ahammed and B.N.Shajeer Sha under the banner of Shamsher Creations. The film stars, Parvathy Ratheesh, Maanav, Sajeer   Ahammed, B.N. Shabeer, Deepu Parassala, Biju Sopanam, Sethu Lekshmi, Moly Angamaly, Master Jiyaaz and Master Faraaz. Parvathy Ratheesh plays a salient, yet enigmatic role in the movie.

Plot 
The main theme of the movie revolves around four bachelors, Vineeth, Ikku, Stephen and Sudhi. The story advances on an incident that made unforeseen, dramatic changes in their lives. Once a spirit comes to their flat. This Spirit (Lechmi) doesn't remember anything, where she comes from, her real name, who killed her, and so on. With the help of Baba Swami (Biju Sopanam), an exorcist they came to know more about the spirit. The story of the film revolves around the incidents happen after it.

Development 
The producer as well as an artist of the movie Mr. Sajeer Ahammed's friendship with the director B.N.Shajeer Sha and with the artist Maanav has paved way for the development of the story into the movie "Lechmi".  Various discussions were done from the beginning and proper screening and analysis were executed from time to time.

Working with their story,  B.N. Shajeer and Sajeer Ahammed, following their collaborating efforts on the film stated that the film will surely create a radical impact on the society as it centralizes extensively on the pressing issues of women's safety. Through the characters of the four "gentlemen", the story points up the fact that humanity has still not completely dissipated from our society. Parvathy Ratheesh, who plays the leading role in the film commented that the story has impressed her since it's a female-oriented subject with a powerful pertinent message. The crew strongly represents the movie as "a real family entertainer."

Lechmi's shooting began on 27 April 2017 at Thiruvananthapuram and was completed on 4 June 2017. The filming covered most of Thiruvananthapuram and Tamil Nadu border areas. Some crucial shots and song sequences were taken at Merryland and Chitranjali studios and at some places in and around Thiruvananthapuram.  Actress Parvathy Ratheesh was injured May 2017 during filming in Trivandrum.

Origin and writing 
The director's personal fascination for morbidity and versatility is what drives the script. Lechmi is the director's second movie, his first being Lbw : Love, Breakup & War. After working on the script for quite a long time, B.N. Shajeer Sha and Sajeer Ahammed, the brains behind the movie, decided to move on with their subject.  The movie seeks to elicit elevated heartbeats at different stages and assures to reach its heights at the climax. Here horror overlaps with fantasy, supernatural components, and thriller genres. Stunt master Brucelee Rajesh has played an incredible role in giving the fight sequence a most thrilling and a nerve-racking outlook. Ghostly appearances of artists were made explicitly morbid and dreadful with the skill of the make-up artist Mr. Sreejith Kalai Arasu.

Cast 
 Parvathy Ratheesh as Lechmi
 Maanav as Vinu
 Sajeer Ahammed as Stephen
 Deepu Parassala as Ikku
 B.N.Shabeer as Sudhi
 Biju Sopanam as Baba Swami
 Poloko Motlaleng as Samuel "Sam"Anderson
 Sreekutty as Maami
 Vaiga as Soumya
 Sethulekshmi as Amma
 Moly Angamaly (Chala Mary) as Kunjumol
 Master Faraaz as Christy
 Master Jiyaaz as Kannan
 Kalabhavan Rahman as Security
 Rajesh R Nair as Gounder

Filming 
Shooting commenced on 27 April 2017. A  pooja was conducted at S.P. Grand Days, Thiruvananthapuram on 24 April. The presence and blessings of well-known artists like M.R. Gopakumar, Maniyanpilla Raju and other veterans of Malayalam film industry made the occasion a  prestigious one. The film was shot at locations in and around Thiruvananthapuram and at times at Kerala-Tamil Nadu border areas. Major fight scenes and some song sequences were shot in Chitranjali and Merryland studios. Shooting got over by 4 June 2017. Mathew Jacob gave voice for Poloko Motlaleng and it was widely appreciated for the modulation and accent.

Music 
Music was incorporated as an essential part of the movie. The film's soundtrack was composed by Shah Broz with lyrics written by Shahida Basheer and Sajeer Ahammed. The Background Music is done by Dheeraj Sukumaran.

References

External links 
 
 

2017 films
2017 comedy horror films
2017 horror films
Indian comedy horror films
2010s Malayalam-language films
2017 comedy films